"Sinkin' Soon" is a song written by Norah Jones and Lee Alexander, and is the second single from Jones's third solo album, Not Too Late (2007). It was released in the United States on March 26, 2007 (see 2007 in music).

Alexander wrote most of the song, with Jones composing the bridge. According to Jones, they couldn't play the whole song before they recorded it, so they went out for dinner and drank beer. "I guess we needed a little bit of that drunken sailor vibe because we came back and recorded this on the first take", Jones said. Jones's old friend J. Walter Hawkes contributed a trombone solo, and M. Ward performed backing vocals.

Music video

The music video was filmed in November 2006 and directed by Ace Norton, who directed the video for Jones's previous single, "Thinking About You". It was shot in one day at an industrial strip south of downtown Los Angeles and features special effects and stop motion animation. It was released on March 1, 2007.

It begins with various household items in a darkly lit utility room assembling themselves into Jones's backing band. Jones performs the song with the band, as a doll in a doll's house and on a miniature stage, and she dances with an empty tuxedo before performing the song in a mouse hole, dressed in a mouse costume. The video ends with the items assuming their original positions in the room.

Personnel
Norah Jones - vocals, piano
J. Walter Hawkes - trombone
Jesse Harris - guitjo
Kevin Breit - mandolin
Lee Alexander - bass
Andrew Borger - drums, slit drum, pots & pans
Daru Oda - vocals
M. Ward - vocals

Notes

2007 singles
American jazz songs
Norah Jones songs
Songs written by Norah Jones
Songs written by Lee Alexander (musician)
2006 songs
Blue Note Records singles